Ivica Kostović (born 7 June 1943) is a Croatian politician and physician.

He was born in Zagreb. After receiving a degree in medicine in 1967 at the University of Zagreb, he worked in the Institute for Anatomy Drago Perović at the School of Medicine, where he founded and headed the Department of Neuroanatomy in 1987. He also founded the Croatian Institute for Brain Research in 1990, where he established the Department of Neuroscience. He has served as the Director of the Institute since 2000.

He is a professor of the Zagreb School of Medicine, also serving as the dean of faculty in the period 1992–93. He teaches as a professor at the University of Amsterdam. He has published a number of discoveries in the field of neurobiology and developmental neuroanatomy of the cerebral cortex. He was the Head of the Information Department at the Ministry of Health (1991-1993), Deputy Prime Minister for Social Affairs (1993–95) and of Humanitarian Affairs (1995–98). In 1995–98 he served as the Minister of Science and Technology, and in 1998–2000 he was the Head the Office of the President. In the period 2000–03 he served as Deputy Speaker of the Croatian Parliament. He is a full member of the Croatian Academy of Sciences and Arts since 2006. He was awarded the National Award for Lifetime Achievement in 2010.

See also
Subplate

References

1943 births
Living people
Politicians from Zagreb
Croatian neuroscientists
Government ministers of Croatia
School of Medicine, University of Zagreb alumni
Academic staff of the University of Zagreb
Academic staff of the University of Amsterdam
Croatian Democratic Union politicians
Members of the Croatian Academy of Sciences and Arts
Members of Academia Europaea
Physicians from Zagreb